The 1st Special Forces Operational Detachment–Delta (1st SFOD-D), referred to variously as Delta Force, Combat Applications Group (CAG), Army Compartmented Elements (ACE), "The Unit", or within Joint Special Operations Command (JSOC), Task Force Green, is a special operations force of the United States Army, under operational control of JSOC. The unit's missions primarily involve counterterrorism, hostage rescue, direct action, and special reconnaissance, often against high-value targets.

Delta Force, along with its Navy and Air Force counterparts, DEVGRU and the 24th Special Tactics Squadron, are the U.S. military's tier one special mission units that are tasked with performing the most complex, covert, and dangerous missions directed by the President of the United States and the Secretary of Defense.

Delta Force soldiers are selected primarily from the Army Special Operations Command's elite 75th Ranger Regiment and Special Forces, though members can be selected from other special operations units and conventional forces across the Army and sometimes other military branches.

History

Delta Force was created in 1977 after numerous well-publicized terrorist incidents led the U.S. government to develop a full-time counter-terrorism unit.

Key military and government figures had already been briefed on this type of unit in the early 1960s. Charlie Beckwith, a Special Forces (Green Berets) officer and Vietnam War veteran, served as an exchange officer with the British Army's 22nd Special Air Service Regiment during the Malayan Emergency. On his return, Beckwith presented a detailed report highlighting the U.S. Army's vulnerability in not having a SAS-type unit. U.S. Army Special Forces in that period focused on unconventional warfare, but Beckwith recognized the need for "not only a force of teachers, but a force of doers". He envisioned highly adaptable and completely autonomous small teams with a broad array of special skills for direct action and counter-terrorism missions. He briefed military and government figures, who were resistant to creating a new unit outside of Special Forces or changing existing methods.

Finally, in the mid-1970s, as the threat of terrorism grew, Pentagon and Army senior leaders appointed Beckwith to form the unit. Beckwith estimated that it would take 24 months to get his new unit mission ready. Beckwith's estimate came from a conversation he had had earlier with Brigadier John Watts while in England in 1976. Watts had made it clear to Beckwith that it would take eighteen months to build a squadron, but advised him to tell Army leaders that it would take two years, and not to "let anyone talk (him) out of this." To justify why it would take two years to build Delta, Beckwith and his staff drafted what they dubbed the "Robert Redford Paper," which outlined its necessities and historical precedents for a four-phase selection/assessment process.

Delta Force was established on 19 November 1977, by Beckwith and Colonel Thomas Henry. In the meantime, Colonel Bob "Black Gloves" Mountel of the 5th Special Forces Group created a unit "to breach the short-term gap" that existed until Delta was ready, dubbed Blue Light. The initial members of the unit were screened from volunteers and put through a specialized selection process in early 1978, involving a series of land navigation problems in mountainous terrain while carrying increasing weight. The purpose was to test candidates' endurance, stamina, willingness to endure, and mental resolve. The first training course lasted from April to September 1978. Delta Force was certified as fully mission capable in fall 1979, right before the Iran hostage crisis.

On 4 November 1979, 52 American diplomats and citizens were taken captive and held in the U.S. embassy in Tehran, Iran. Delta Force was tasked to plan and execute Operation Eagle Claw, the effort to recover the hostages from the embassy by force on the nights of 24 and 25 April in 1980. The operation was aborted due to helicopter failures. The review commission that examined the failure found 23 problems with the operation, among them unexpected weather encountered by the aircraft, command-and-control problems between the multi-service component commanders, a collision between a helicopter and a ground-refueling tanker aircraft, and mechanical problems that reduced the number of available helicopters from eight to five (one fewer than the minimum desired) before the mission contingent could leave the trans-loading/refueling site.

After the failed operation, the U.S. government realized more changes were needed. The 160th Special Operations Aviation Regiment (Airborne), also known as the "Night Stalkers", was created for special operations requiring air support. The Navy's SEAL Team Six, an earlier incarnation of the current Naval Special Warfare Development Group, was created for maritime counter-terrorism operations. The Joint Special Operations Command was created for command and control of the military's various counter-terrorism units.

Name 

In a 2010 article, Marc Ambinder reported that Army Compartmented Elements (ACE) was a new cover name for Delta Force. However, Ambinder subsequently wrote an e-book about JSOC in which he reported that the Army Compartmented Elements is a different unit from Delta.

Organization and structure 
The unit is under the organization of the U.S. Army Special Operations Command (USASOC), but is controlled by the Joint Special Operations Command (JSOC). Command of 1st SFOD-D is a colonel's billet. Virtually all information about the unit is highly classified and details about specific missions or operations generally are not available publicly. The unit is headquartered at Fort Bragg, North Carolina.

Delta Force's structure is similar to the British 22 SAS Regiment, which inspired Delta's formation. In Not a Good Day to Die: The Untold Story of Operation Anaconda, Army Times staff writer Sean Naylor describes Delta as having, at the time (in 2001), nearly 1,000 soldiers, of whom about 250 to 300 are trained to conduct direct action and hostage rescue operations. The rest are combat support and service support personnel who are among the very best in their fields.

Naylor further details Delta Force's structure in his book Relentless Strike: The Secret History of Joint Special Operations Command. He describes a few formations in Delta, primarily the following operational squadrons:
 A Squadron (Assault)
 B Squadron (Assault)
 C Squadron (Assault)
 D Squadron (Assault)
 E Squadron (Aviation)
 G Squadron (Advanced Force Operations (AFO), formerly known as Operational Support Troop (OST))
 Combat Support Squadron
 Signal Squadron

A, B, C, and DSquadrons are saber squadrons (assault). CSquadron was activated in 1990 and DSquadron in 2006. Combat Support Squadron was activated in 2005. ESquadron was activated in 1989 and is stationed separately in Fort Eustis, Virginia, where it is known as the Aviation Technology Office. An earlier forerunner of the unit was known as SeaSpray.

Within each squadron there are three troops: two assault troops for direct action, and a reconnaissance and surveillance troop. Each squadron is commanded by a Lieutenant Colonel (O-5) and troops are led by Majors (O-4). Each troop has four teams, each one led by a team leader, a Master Sergeant (E-8) or Sergeant First Class (E-7), and an assistant team leader who can also have the same rank. Each team can have as many as twelve, or as few as one or two operators.

Recruitment 
Since the 1990s, the Army has posted recruitment notices for the 1st SFOD-D. The Army, however, has never released an official fact sheet for the elite force. The recruitment notices in Fort Bragg's newspaper, Paraglide, refer to Delta Force by name, and label it "...the U.S. Army's special operations unit organized for the conduct of missions requiring rapid response with surgical application of a wide variety of unique special operations skills...". The notice states that applicants must be male, in the grade of E-4 through E-8, have at least two and a half years of service remaining in their enlistment, be 21 years or older, and score high enough on the Armed Services Vocational Aptitude Battery to attend a briefing to be considered for admission. Candidates must be airborne qualified or volunteer for airborne training. Officer candidates need to be O-3 or O-4. All candidates must be eligible for a security clearance level of "Secret" and have not been convicted by court-martial or have disciplinary action noted in their official military personnel file under the provisions of Article 15 of the Uniform Code of Military Justice.

On 29 June 2006 during a session of the Committee on Armed Services, General Wayne Downing testified before the U.S. House of Representatives that "[t]he Delta Force is probably 70 percent Rangers who have come out of either a Ranger [to] Special Forces track or directly from [the] Ranger Regiment to Delta".

Selection process 
Selection is held twice a year (March to April, and September to October) at Camp Dawson, West Virginia, and lasts 4 weeks. Eric Haney's book Inside Delta Force described the selection course and its inception in detail. Haney wrote that the course began with standard tests including push-ups, sit-ups, and a  run, an inverted crawl and a  swim fully dressed. The candidates were then put through a series of land navigation courses, one of which required them to travel  at night while carrying a  rucksack. With every successive challenge, the distance to cover and the weight of the rucksack are increased, while less time is allotted. The final challenge was a  march with a  rucksack over rough terrain that had to be completed in an unknown amount of time; this was also colloquially known as "The Long Walk". Haney wrote that only the senior officer and NCO in charge of selection were allowed to see the set time limits, but all assessment and selection tasks and conditions were set by Delta training cadre.

The mental portion of the testing began with numerous psychological exams. Each candidate was then called to face a board of Delta instructors, unit psychologists, and the Delta commander, who asked the candidate a barrage of questions and then dissected every response and mannerism to exhaust the candidate mentally. The commander then approached the candidate and told him if he had been selected. Those who passed the screening process underwent an intense six-month Operator Training Course (OTC), to learn counter-terrorism and counter-intelligence techniques, and training with firearms and other weapons. Participants were allowed very little contact with friends and family for the duration.

In an interview, former Delta operator Paul Howe mentioned the high attrition rate of the Delta selection course. He said that out of his two classes of 120 applicants each, 12 to 14 completed the selection.

The Central Intelligence Agency's secretive Special Activities Center (SAC) and more specifically its Special Operations Group (SOG), often works with – and recruits – former operators from Delta Force.

Training 

According to Eric Haney, the unit's Operator Training Course is approximately six months long. While the course is constantly changing, the skills taught broadly to include the following:
 Marksmanship
 The trainees shoot without aiming at stationary targets at close range until they gain almost complete accuracy, then progress to moving targets.
 Once these shooting skills are perfected, trainees move to a shoot house and clear rooms of "enemy" targets – first one only, then two at a time, three, and finally four. When all can demonstrate sufficient skill, "hostages" are added to the mix.
 Demolitions and Breaching
 Trainees learn how to pick many different locks, including those on cars and safes.
 Advanced demolition, and bomb-making using common materials.
 Combined skills. The FBI, FAA, and other agencies were used to advise the training of this portion of OTC.
 The new Delta operators use demolition and marksmanship at the shoot house and other training facilities to train for hostage and counter-terrorist operations with assault and sniper troops working together. They practice terrorist or hostage situations in buildings, aircraft, and other settings.
 All trainees learn how to set sniper positions around a building containing hostages. They learn the proper ways to set up a Tactical Operations Center (TOC) and communicate in an organized manner. Although Delta has specialized sniper troops, all members go through this training.
 The students then go back to the shoot house and the "hostages" are replaced with other students and Delta Force members. Live ammunition is known to have been used in these exercises, to test the students, and build trust between one another.
 Tradecraft. During the first OTCs and Delta creation, CIA personnel were used to teach this portion.
 Students learn different espionage-related skills, such as dead drops, brief encounters, pickups, load and unload signals, danger and safe signals, surveillance and counter-surveillance.
 Executive Protection. During the first OTCs and creation of Delta, the U.S. State Department's Diplomatic Security Service and the United States Secret Service advised Delta.
 Students take an advanced driving course to learn  to use a vehicle or many vehicles as defensive and offensive weapons.
 They then learn techniques for VIP and diplomatic protection developed by the Secret Service and DSS.
 Culmination Exercise
 A final test requires the students to apply and dynamically adapt all of the skills that they have learned.

Delta Force trains with other foreign special operations units to improve tactics and increase relationships with them including the Australian Special Air Service Regiment and 2nd Commando Regiment the British Special Air Service and Special Boat Service, Canada's Joint Task Force 2 and Israel's Sayeret Matkal.

Secrecy 
The Department of Defense tightly controls information about Delta Force and usually refuses to comment publicly on the highly secretive unit and its activities, unless the unit is part of a major operation or a unit member has been killed. Delta operators are granted an enormous amount of flexibility and autonomy during military operations overseas. Civilian hair styles and facial hair are allowed to enable the members to blend in and avoid recognition as military personnel.

The term "operator" 

The origin of the term "operator" in American special operations comes from the U.S. Army Special Forces (aka the Green Berets). The Army Special Forces was established in 1952, ten years before the Navy SEALs and 25 years before Delta. Every other modern U.S. special operations unit in the Army, Navy, Air Force, and Marines was established after 1977. In Veritas, the Journal of Army Special Operations History, Charles H. Briscoe stated that the Army "Special Forces did not misappropriate the appellation. Unbeknownst to most members of the Army Special Operations Force (ARSOF) community, that moniker was adopted by the Special Forces in the mid-1950s." He goes on to state that all qualified enlisted and officers in Special Forces had to "voluntarily subscribe to the provisions of the 'Code of the Special Forces Operator' and pledge themselves to its tenets by witnessed signature." This pre-dates every other special operations unit that currently uses the term/title operator.

Inside the United States Special Operations community, an "operator" is a Delta Force member who has completed selection and has graduated OTC (Operator Training Course). "Operator" was used by Delta Force to distinguish between combat personnel and combat support/service support assigned to the unit.  Other special operations forces use specific names for their jobs, such as Army Rangers and Air Force Pararescuemen. The Navy uses the acronym SEAL for both their special warfare teams and their individual members, also known as "special operators". In 2006 the Navy created "Special Warfare Operator" (SO) as a rating specific to Naval Special Warfare enlisted personnel, grades E-4 to E-9. (See Navy special warfare ratings). "Operator" has become a colloquial term for almost all special operations forces in the U.S. military and worldwide.

Operations and clandestine operations 

Most operations assigned to Delta are classified, but some details have become public knowledge. For service during Operation Urgent Fury, Delta was awarded the Joint Meritorious Unit Award. The unit was awarded the Valorous Unit Award for extraordinary heroism during the Modelo Prison hostage rescue mission and the capture of Manuel Noriega in December 1989 during Operation Just Cause in Panama. 1st SFOD-D operators from C Squadron were also involved in Operation Gothic Serpent in Somalia.

During Operation Iraqi Freedom and Operation Enduring Freedom, 1st SFOD-D was awarded the Presidential Unit Citation for combat operations in Afghanistan from 4 October 2001 to 15 March 2002 and Iraq from 19 March 2003 to 13 December 2003.

On 26 October 2019, Delta operators accompanied by members of the 75th Ranger Regiment conducted a raid on the compound of Islamic State leader Abu Bakr al-Baghdadi, leading to his death.

See also 

 List of Delta Force members
 List of special forces units

References

Further reading

 
 
 
 
 
 
 
 
 
 
 
 National Geographic documentary: Road to Baghdad.

External links

 Military.com article on Delta Force Archived
 Special-ops.com article Archived
 Transcript of Sean Naylor's speech to American Enterprise Institute Archived 

Delta Force
Counterterrorist organizations
Military units and formations established in 1977
Military units and formations in North Carolina
Special Operations Forces of the United States
Special operations units and formations of the United States Army
United States Joint Special Operations Command